Dinwiddie County Pullman Car is a historic Pullman car located near Midlothian, Chesterfield County, Virginia. It was built in 1926 as the Mt. Angeles by the Pullman Company; one of thirty cars on Lot 4998, all to Plan 3521A.  It is a heavyweight, all-steel sleeping car with ten sections and one observation lounge. In June 1934 Pullman rebuilt it to Plan 3521F and changed the name of the car to Dinwiddie and again in April 1937 the name was changed to Dinwiddie County, which name it retains to this day. These name changes represent the car's transfer to service on the Norfolk and Western Railway's trains operating to and from Virginia.

The car was sold to the National Railway Historical Society in 1965. It appeared in the 1976 television movie Eleanor and Franklin as the funeral car for Franklin Delano Roosevelt.

It was listed on the National Register of Historic Places in 1991.

See also
Mt. Broderick Pullman Car – another car from the same Lot, that had a different refurbishment.

References

Pullman Company
Rail passenger cars of the United States
Railway vehicles on the National Register of Historic Places
National Register of Historic Places in Chesterfield County, Virginia
Rail transportation on the National Register of Historic Places in Virginia
1926 in rail transport
Transportation in Chesterfield County, Virginia
Norfolk and Western Railway